Carrigtwohill, officially Carrigtohill , is a town in County Cork, Ireland with a population of 5,080 (2016). It is 12 kilometres east of Cork city. It is connected to Cork Suburban Rail and is bypassed by the N25 road. Carrigtwohill is one of the fastest-growing towns in the region, and a hub for pharmaceutical and biotechnology companies. Carrigtwohill is part of the Cork East Dáil constituency.

Name 

However, in his book Church and Parish Records (1903), the Rev. J.H. Cole of the Church of Ireland said that tuathail is used in the sense of "left-handed", or "North". Cole says it is so called because, whereas most of the rocks in that part of the country run east-west, the rocks at Carrigtwohill run north-south.

The town's anglicised name first appeared in written documents in 1234 as Karrectochell. Later spellings include Carrigtuoghill, Carrigtoghill, Carrigtowhill and Carrigtowill.

Places of interest 

The huge rock from which Carrigtwohill derives its name is about half a mile north-eastwards of the town itself, and is in the townland of Carrigane. The rock is honeycombed with caves; some are large and extend for miles underground where stalactites are to be found. Tradition has it that a goat once entered one of these caves, emerging in the townland of Ballintubrid, a few miles southwards. The cave where the goat emerged is called Poll an Ghabhair, meaning The Goat's Hole.

The town is the home of Barryscourt Castle. The castle was originally built in the 12th century and rebuilt in the 16th century. The castle grounds house a cafe and a gift shop. It was extensively refurbished between 1991 and 2006. Tours are held daily during the summer months.

Fota Island is also located close to Carrigtwohill. This island is home to Ireland's only Wildlife Park, and also the restored Fota House and Arboretum. Fota Island Resort includes the 5 star Fota Island Hotel, as well as two championship golf courses, on which the Irish Open was played in 2001, 2002 and 2014.

Ireland's only permanent drive-in cinema, "Movie Junction", is located in Fota Retail Park to the west of the town. It opened in November 2010, expanding to a second screen in 2013.

The biggest agricultural show in Ireland, the National Ploughing Championships took place to the east of the village in 1992. Over the three days it was on, the event attracted almost 180,000 people.

Economy 

A number of multinational corporations have premises in the IDA Business Park to the west of the town, including GE Healthcare, Stryker, Merck Millipore, Abbott Laboratories, Gilead Sciences and Rockwell-Proscon. The local economy was dealt a blow in October 2007 when the biotechnology giant Amgen scrapped indefinitely its partially constructed plant at Ballyadam on the outskirts of Carrigtwohill.

A number of housing developments have been built in Carrigtwohill, including Castlelake to the west, Cluain Cairn and Cul Ard to the north. Supermarket chain Aldi has a presence in the Castlesquare retail development, part of the Castlelake development.

Demographics 
As of the 2016 census, Carrigtwohill had a population of 5,080 (2,510/49.4% were male, 2,570/50.6% were female), of which 68% were white Irish, less than 1% Irish traveller, 19% other white, 6% black, 2% Asian, 1% other, while 3% had not stated an ethnic background.
In terms of religion, the area was 79% Catholic, 10% other stated religion, 8% no religion, and 3% not stated religion.

Transport

Rail
Carrigtwohill railway station is station on the Cork Suburban Rail service between Midleton and Cork city. Passengers for Cobh change at Glounthaune. A second station, Carrigtwohill West, was proposed to serve the west of the town, Fota Retail Park, and the IDA industrial area - but did not progress beyond planning stage.

The original Carrigtwohill railway station was opened on 2 November 1859, closed for goods traffic on 2 December 1974 and fully closed from 6 September 1976. A new station was officially opened on 30 July 2009 on the north of the town, with Park n' Ride facilities for commuters travelling to Cork City.

Bus
Carrigtwohill is covered by bus services, including route 261 from Cork to Midleton. Carrigtwohill is also served by bus routes 240, 241 and 260 with connections to Youghal, Whitegate, Cloyne, Ballycotton and Ardmore.

Sport 
Gaelic Athletic Association is well supported in Carrigtwohill. The local GAA club's facilities include a modern gymnasium and three playing pitches - two of which are floodlit. Carrigtwohill GAA have a senior hurling team, having won the Cork County Premier Intermediate Hurling championship in 2007. In 2011 Carrigtwohill won the county final, the first time since 1918.

There is also a soccer club, Carrigtwohill United AFC, which plays at Ballyadam, to the North East of the town. They have several pitches and dressing rooms at Ballyadam.

Various clubs active in Carrigtwohill include Glenmary Basketball Club, Carrigtwohill Badminton Club, an athletics club and a tennis club.

Carrigtwohill is home to the Jae Hun Kim Taekwon-do Institute Ireland which is the first European club affiliated to the Boston Institute which is led by Grand Master Jae Hun Kim.

Notable people
 Dáibhí Ó Bruadair - Irish language poet from the Carrigtwohill area
 Gerald Heard - British writer who spent some of his childhood in his grandmother's home near Carrigtwohill
 Ailis McSweeney - athlete and sprinter
 Niall McCarthy - Inter-county hurler
 Willie John Daly - Inter-county hurler
 Dominic McGlinchey - at one time the 'most wanted man in Ireland' was found hiding in Carrigtwohill

References

Further reading

External links 

Carrigtwohill Community Council 
Barryscourt Castle (Cork)

Towns and villages in County Cork
Civil parishes of County Cork